Agno, officially the Municipality of Agno, is a 3rd class municipality in the province of Pangasinan, Philippines. According to the 2020 census, it has a population of 29,947 people.

The town is characterized by rolling terrain and rainfed rice fields.  Near the poblacion, or town plaza, the road passes along the Mabini river or (Balincaguing River), which drains into the South China Sea further west.  The town plaza is home to a centuries-old Roman Catholic church, as well as one of the first congregations of the Philippine Independent Church.  The town shares borders with the town of Bani to the north, the town of Mabini and Alaminos to the east and with Burgos to the south. Contrary to popular belief, the Agno River do not pass this municipality.

The town's main livelihood is fishing and agriculture, although a number of her sons and daughters work as doctors, physical therapist, nurses, engineers, computer programmers and accountants in numerous countries around the globe. On top of that, the town produces successful teachers, policemen and policewomen, and lawyers.

During the summer months of April and May the town's market abounds with fresh fruits such as mangoes and duhat, as well as fresh catch such as tuna, flying fish, grouper, lobsters and other seafood.

The town is home to natural attractions such as the Mabini river, the Umbrella Rocks in Sabangan, as well as several beaches, Agno Beach being the longest and most popular. There are several other beaches hidden along the coast such as the Macaboboni cove (which features a small cave) as well as a white beach in Barangay Gayusan. To the southern end of Agno Beach, one can dive from a two-story-high rock amidst crashing waves and end up in a beautiful coral garden below.

Arthur Cabantac was the mayor of Agno from 2007 until he was shot in 2008 while playing Mahjong. He was then succeeded by Jose N. Pajeta Jr, the town's vice mayor during that time.

History
The name Agno was derived from a species of swamp tree called “Agno Casto”, a chaste tree used for medicinal concoctions to relieve pain and illness, that grew abundantly in the locality. In time, “Agno” was retained to become the name of the town.

Agno was formally organized into Municipality in 1791. During the Spanish regime and early part of the American era, Agno was part of the Province of Zambales, but upon enactment of Public Act No. 1004 dated November 30, 1903, of the Philippine Commission, the northern part of Zambales including Agno was annexed to the Province of Pangasinan.

Geography

Barangays
Agno is politically subdivided into 17 barangays. These barangays are headed by elected officials: Barangay Captain, Barangay Council, whose members are called Barangay Councilors. All are elected every three years.

 Allabon
 Aloleng
 Bangan Oda
 Baruan
 Boboy
 Cayungnan
 Dangley
 Gayusan
 Macaboboni
 Magsaysay
 Namatucan
 Patar
 Poblacion East
 Poblacion West
 San Juan
 Tupa
 Viga

Climate

Demographics

Economy

Heritage

Government
Agno, belonging to the first congressional district of the province of Pangasinan, is governed by a mayor designated as its local chief executive and by a municipal council as its legislative body in accordance with the Local Government Code. The mayor, vice mayor, and the councilors are elected directly by the people through an election which is being held every three years.

Elected officials

References

External links

 Agno Profile at PhilAtlas.com
 Municipal Profile at the National Competitiveness Council of the Philippines
 Agno at the Pangasinan Government Website
 Local Governance Performance Management System
 [ Philippine Standard Geographic Code]
 Philippine Census Information
  Agno, Pangasinan website

Municipalities of Pangasinan